This page lists peer-reviewed journals in educational and closely related fields.

Discipline-specific

Arts and humanities
Arts Education Policy Review
Arts and Humanities in Higher Education

Business and economics
Academy of Management Learning and Education
Journal of Economic Education
Journal of Marketing Education

Civics

Engineering
Journal of Engineering Education

Ethics and philosophy
Journal of Moral Education
Teaching Ethics
Teaching Philosophy

Governance and politics
Teaching Public Administration

History
The History Teacher

Literacy
Journal of Literacy Research

Physical education
African Journal for Physical, Health Education, Recreation and Dance
European Physical Education Review

Healthcare
American Journal of Pharmaceutical Education
African Journal for Physical, Health Education, Recreation and Dance
Health Education Journal
Health Education Research
The Journal of Chiropractic Education
Journal of Continuing Education in Nursing
Medical Education
Medical Teacher

Languages
Asian Journal of Applied Linguistics
Assessing Writing
College English
English for Specific Purposes World
English Journal
Fremdsprachen und Hochschule
Hispania
International Multilingual Research Journal
Japanese Language and Literature
Journal of Second Language Writing
Journal of Writing Research
Language Learning
Language Teaching Research
Language Testing
The Reading Teacher
Second Language Research
Studies in Language Testing

Mathematics
Crux Mathematicorum
Educational Studies in Mathematics
International Journal of Science and Mathematics Education
Journal for Research in Mathematics Education
Journal of Mathematics Teacher Education
Journal of Statistics Education
Mathematics and Computer Education
Mathematics Education Research Journal
Mathematics Magazine
Philosophy of Mathematics Education Journal
Teaching Mathematics and Its Applications
The Mathematics Educator
The Mathematics Enthusiast
The Mathematical Gazette

Music
Bulletin of the Council for Research in Music Education
International Journal of Music Education
Journal of Music Teacher Education
Journal of Music Theory Pedagogy
Journal of Research in Music Education
Music Educators Journal
UPDATE: Applications of Research in Music Education

Social science

Social work
Journal of Social Work Education

Sociology
Social Education
Teaching Sociology

Sciences
Journal of Research in Science Teaching
Resonance

Applied
The Journal of Food Science Education

Biology
Journal of Biological Education

Chemistry
Chemistry Education Research and Practice
Education for Chemical Engineers
Journal of Chemical Education

Engineering
Journal of Faculty of Engineering

Physics
American Journal of Physics
European Journal of Physics
Physical Review Special Topics: Physics Education Research
Physics Education
The Physics Teacher

Educational psychology
Assessment for Effective Intervention
British Journal of Educational Psychology
Canadian Journal of School Psychology
Contemporary Educational Psychology
Early Childhood Research Quarterly
Educational and Psychological Measurement
Educational Psychologist
International Journal of Mentoring and Coaching in Education
Journal of Educational Psychology
Journal of Positive Behavior Interventions
Journal of Psychoeducational Assessment
Journal of Research in Reading
Learning and Individual Differences
Mind, Brain, and Education
Psychology in the Schools
School Psychology

Educational technology
Australasian Journal of Educational Technology
British Journal of Educational Technology
Bulletin of Science, Technology & Society
Computers in Education
Educational Technology & Society
IEEE Transactions on Learning Technologies
International Journal of Mobile and Blended Learning
Journal of Computer-Mediated Communication
Virtual Reality in the Schools

Learner-specific

Deaf studies
American Annals of the Deaf
Journal of Deaf Studies and Deaf Education
Sign Language Studies

Special education
Adult Learning
British Journal of Special Education
Exceptional Children
Focus on Autism and Other Developmental Disabilities
Gifted Child Quarterly
Gifted Child Today
Journal for the Education of the Gifted
Journal of Early Intervention
Journal of Learning Disabilities
Journal of Research in Special Educational Needs
Journal of Special Education and Rehabilitation
Learning Disability Quarterly
Remedial and Special Education
Research and Practice for Persons with Severe Disabilities
Teacher Education and Special Education
Teaching Exceptional Children
Young Exceptional Children

Educational research

Comparative Education
Comparative Education
Comparative Education Review
Current Issues in Comparative Education
International Journal of Comparative Education and Development

Distance education
American Journal of Distance Education

Diversity in education
International Journal of Multicultural Education
Journal of Diversity in Higher Education
Race Ethnicity and Education

General education
British Journal of Educational Studies
Education Journal
Educational Practice and Theory
Teachers College Record

International education
International Journal of Comparative Education and Development
Journal of Research in International Education
Journal of Studies in International Education

Level of education

Early childhood education
Early Childhood Education Journal
Early Childhood Research Quarterly
Journal of Early Childhood Literacy

Primary education
Elementary School Journal

Secondary education
Career Development and Transition for Exceptional Individuals
The High School Journal

Tertiary education
Active Learning in Higher Education
College Quarterly
College Teaching
Community College Review
Higher Education
Higher Education for the Future
Higher Education Review
The Journal of Higher Education
The Review of Higher Education
Teaching in Higher Education

Life-long learning
Adult Education Quarterly

Management and policy
Education Finance and Policy
Education Policy Analysis Archives
Educational Administration Quarterly
Educational Evaluation and Policy Analysis
Educational Management Administration & Leadership
Educational Policy
Journal of Education Policy
Journal of Educational Administration and History
Management in Education

Sociology of education
British Journal of Sociology of Education
Education, Citizenship and Social Justice
Educational Philosophy and Theory
Gender and Education
Journal of Philosophy of Education
Sociology of Education

 
Education